Must've Been Live is a live country music album by the American rock and roll band Supersuckers. It was released in November 2001 on Mid-Fi Recordings.

Track listing
 "Dead in the Water" – 2:23
 "Good Livin'" – 2:12
 "Roamin' Round" – 3:02
 "Roadworn and Weary" – 4:07
 "The Captain" – 4:22
 "Hangin' Out With Me" – 2:20
 "Barricade" – 3:28
 "Drivin' Nails in My Coffin" – 3:04
 "Cowpoke" – 2:34
 "Don't Go Blue" – 5:16
 "Must've Been High" – 4:25
 "One Cigarette Away" – 2:59
 "Alabama, Louisiana or Maybe Tennessee" – 4:36
 "Hungover Together" – 5:02
 "Non-Addictive Marijuana" – 4:55
 "Ice Cold Beer Only" – 0:54
 "The Image of Me" – 4:27
 "Peace in the Valley" – 4:11
 "Blow You Away" – 1:59

Notes
Tracks 1-13 recorded at Trees in Dallas, Texas
Tracks 14-16 recorded at Casbah in San Diego, California
Tracks 17-19 recorded at Antone's in Austin, Texas

References

Supersuckers albums
2002 live albums